Clara Royer (born 1981) is a French writer and screenwriter. Her first novel, entitled Csillag, was published in 2011. She is the co-writer of the 2015 Hungarian film Son of Saul, which won the award for Best Foreign Language Film at the 88th Academy Awards.

References

1981 births
Living people
French women screenwriters
French screenwriters
Place of birth missing (living people)